La Claridad was a mansion built on Golfview Road in Palm Beach, Florida in 1924 for utilities magnate Clarence H. Geist. It was designed by Palm Beach architect Marion Sims Wyeth. It used tile and wrought iron from Mizner Industries; other furnishings were brought from Spain. In 1948 architect Belford Shoumate turned it into two houses. After removing ten feet from the Geist’s original entrance hall, the living room became the focal point for a house rebuilt to the east; the original entry, loggia, staircase and dining room remained with the corner house to the west.

References

Palm Beach, Florida
Houses in Palm Beach County, Florida
Houses completed in 1924
1924 establishments in Florida